SS Shuntien was a  coastal passenger and cargo liner of the British-owned The China Navigation Company Ltd (CNC). She was built in Hong Kong in 1934 and sunk by enemy action in the Mediterranean Sea with great loss of life in 1941. A Royal Navy corvette rescued most of Shuntiens survivors, but a few hours later the corvette too was sunk and no-one survived.

Peacetime service
Taikoo Dockyard and Engineering Company in Hong Kong built Shuntien for CNC in 1934. She replaced an earlier and smaller SS Shuntien that Scotts at Greenock on the Firth of Clyde had built in 1904 and that was scrapped in 1935.  The new Shuntien was a sister ship of SS Shengking, which Scotts had built in 1931. Both Taikoo Dockyard and CNC were owned by John Swire and Sons Ltd, which is British-owned but based in Hong Kong.

The new Shuntiens engines were steam turbines built by Taikoo Dockyard. She was built to trade along the coast of China, where her relatively shallow draught enabled her to turn in the Hai River at Tianjin and her icebreaker bow equipped her against sea ice in northern waters.

In 1937 Shuntien returned to Taikoo Dockyard for maintenance, and while she was there the Great Hong Kong Typhoon of 1937 blew her ashore. She survived, was refloated and returned to service.

War service and sinking

In the Second World War the British government requisitioned Shuntien and converted her into a Defensively-Equipped Merchant Ship (DEMS). Photographs of Shuntien taken about that time by a US photographer, Harrison Forman, show Shuntien in the Port of Shanghai apparently being converted into a prison ship. Shuntien moved to the Mediterranean, where her British officers supplemented her Chinese crew with Arab and Maltese recruits.

In the Western Desert Campaign in December 1941 Shuntien left Tobruk in Cyrenaica, eastern Libya as a member of Convoy TA 5 bound for Alexandria in Egypt. She was carrying between 800 and 1,000 Italian and German prisoners of war, guarded by more than 40 soldiers of the Durham Light Infantry (DLI).

At about 1902 hrs on the evening of 23 December the Type VIIC  torpedoed Shuntien, blowing off her stern and killing her captain, four officers and chief steward.  Her bow rose in the air and she sank within five minutes without having been able to launch any of her lifeboats.

The total number of survivors that Salvia rescued was about 100. The   rescued a smaller number: between 11 and 19.

The torpedo broke the corvette in two and poured burning bunker oil onto the sea; no-one survived. The small party of survivors aboard Heythrop was landed at Alexandria. It included only one of Shuntien's officers, Second Engineer John Hawkrigg.

See also
 — torpedoed November 1942 while carrying Italian prisoners of war and interned civilians

References

1934 ships
Maritime incidents in December 1941
Merchant ships of Hong Kong
Ships sunk by German submarines in World War II
Ships built in Hong Kong
Shipwrecks of Libya
Steamships of Hong Kong
Swire Group
Ships built by the Taikoo Dockyard and Engineering Company
World War II shipwrecks in the Mediterranean Sea